Mickaël Delage (born 6 August 1985) is a French former professional road and track cyclist, who last rode for UCI WorldTeam .

Career
Born in Libourne, Delage participated at the World Track Championships in Moscow in 2003 as a junior, where he won the silver medal at the points race, after Australian Miles Olman. In that same year he would become national junior champion of France at the team pursuit (alongside Jonathan Mouchel, Yannick Marie and Mickaël Mallie) and the madison (together with Mouchel). In 2004 he would win the national title in the points race at the under-23 level.

Delage spent 17 years as a professional rider on the road, riding for 15 of those years with the  team across two spells. He made his Giro d'Italia debut in 2006 and finished in 129th position and he won the 1st stage of the Tour de l'Avenir. Later that year he would again become French national champion when he won the team pursuit together with Mathieu Ladagnous, Jonathan Mouchel, Sylvain Blanquefort and Mickaël Preau. In 2007 he made his Tour de France debut.

Whilst at Lotto he achieved what he later described as the best performance of his career, finishing as runner-up in the 2009 Clásica de San Sebastián. He returned to FDJ in 2011, where he found a role as a leadout man for Arnaud Démare.

Delage suffered injuries at the 2020 Tour de Pologne when he crashed whilst riding downhill at 80 km/h, including a meniscus injury and friction burns. Following this he decided to retire from competition when his contract expired at the end of the following season. Although his 2021 season was disrupted by undergoing knee surgery in March, he returned to competition at the French National Road Race Championships, and finished his career at Paris–Chauny in the autumn.

Major results

2003
 National Junior Track Championships
1st  Team pursuit
1st  Madison
 2nd  Points race, UCI Junior Track World Championships
2004
 1st  Points race, National Under-23 Track Championships
2005
 9th Overall Circuit Franco-Belge
2006
 1st  Team pursuit, National Track Championships
 1st Stage 1 Tour de l'Avenir
2007
 10th Tour de Vendée
2008
 4th Overall Tour Down Under
2009
 2nd Clásica de San Sebastián
2010
 3rd Road race, National Road Championships
2011
 5th Overall Tour de Luxembourg
 6th Paris–Tours
 7th Overall Tour de Picardie
 9th Overall Four Days of Dunkirk
 9th Grand Prix d'Isbergues
 Tour de France
 Combativity award, Stages 3 & 11
2012
 3rd Cholet-Pays de Loire
 3rd Grand Prix de la Somme
 6th Polynormande
2013
 1st La Roue Tourangelle
 7th Paris–Bourges
2014
 6th Paris–Bourges
 9th Grand Prix d'Isbergues
 10th Grand Prix de la Somme
2016
 1st Stage 1 (TTT) La Méditerranéenne
 4th La Roue Tourangelle
2018
 8th Paris–Bourges
2019
 7th Tro-Bro Léon

Grand Tour general classification results timeline

References

External links

1985 births
Living people
French male cyclists
French track cyclists
People from Libourne
Sportspeople from Gironde
Cyclists from Nouvelle-Aquitaine